Protectionist (foaled 2010) is a Thoroughbred racehorse bred and trained in Germany. He was bred by Christoph Berglar, and owned by Berglar in conjunction with an Australian syndicate.

Background
Protectionist was sired by Monsun, who also sired the 2013 Melbourne Cup winner, Fiorente. The horse is part-owned by his breeder, Christoph Berglar, and also by Australian Bloodstock, a syndicate based in Newcastle, New South Wales.

Racing career
Protectionist won his first race in Hanover during his two-year-old season, and later in the season placed second in a Group 3 race in Krefeld, the Herzog von Ratibor-Rennen. He appeared only twice in his three-year-old season, winning one listed race and placing second in another. During his 2014 European campaign, Protectionist won two races from four starts. He ran second in the listed Preis von Dahlwitz and the Group 2 Großer Preis der Badischen Unternehmen, and then won back-to-back Group 2 victories in the Hansa-Preis (in Hamburg) and the Prix Kergorlay (in Deauville, France). He was ridden by Eduardo Pedroza for both wins.

Protectionist was brought to Australia for the 2014 Spring Racing Carnival, with his trainer, Andreas Wöhler, making his first appearance in Australia since he contested the 2004 Cox Plate with Paolini. Protectionist ran fourth in the Group 2 Herbert Power Stakes, ridden by Craig Williams, and was subsequently installed as an early favourite for the Melbourne Cup with some bookmakers, though this status was acquired by Admire Rakti closer to the race, after his win in the Caulfield Cup.

At the 2014 Melbourne Cup, Protectionist was ridden by British jockey Ryan Moore, who had won the Cox Plate on Adelaide ten days earlier. He won the 3,200-metre race by four lengths from Red Cadeaux, who become the first horse to place second in three Melbourne Cups. Protectionist is the first German-trained horse to win the race. He ran the race in 3:17.71, the fastest time since Media Puzzle in the 2002 race, and the fourth-fastest overall. His winning margin was the biggest victory since Doriemus won the 1995 race.

Pedigree

References

External links 

Melbourne Cup winners
2010 racehorse births
Racehorses bred in Germany
Racehorses trained in Germany
Thoroughbred family 9